Jaan Leetsaar (also Jaan Leetsar; born 3 April 1946 Põltsamaa) is an Estonian politician. He was a member of VII Riigikogu. 1992–1994, he was Minister of Agriculture.

References

Living people
1946 births
Members of the Riigikogu, 1992–1995
People from Põltsamaa
Agriculture ministers of Estonia